Ebrahim, Iran or Deh-e Ebrahim or Deh Ebrahim may refer to:
 Ebrahim, Bushehr
 Deh-e Ebrahim, Khuzestan
 Deh-e , Kohgiluyeh and Boyer-Ahmad
 Deh-e Ebrahim, Sistan and Baluchestan